Gheorghe Falcă (born 22 January 1967 in Brad, Hunedoara County) is a Romanian politician and engineer. He was the mayor of Arad from the summer of 2004 up until 2019. He is currently warranted as a MEP on behalf of Romania in the European Parliament.

References

Johannis, primar al Sibiului cu 90% dintre voturi., Antena 3, accesat la 18 iunie 2013

HARTA DEFINITIVĂ A ALEGERILOR. Care sunt noii primari si presedinti de Consilii Judetene. Ce orase mari si judete a pierdut PDL in fata USL - Alegeri locale, 12 iunie 2012, Victor Cozmei, HotNews.ro, accesat la 18 iunie 2013

Living people
Politehnica University of Timișoara alumni
People from Arad, Romania
1967 births
MEPs for Romania 2019–2024
Mayors of places in Romania